Isaya Klein Ikkink (born 13 May 2003) is a Dutch sprinter, who specializes in the 400 metres.

He won a bronze medal at the 2023 European Athletics Indoor Championships in the 4 × 400 metres relay.

References

2003 births
Dutch male sprinters
Living people
21st-century Dutch people